Janez Polda (25 May 1924 in Mojstrana – 20 March 1964) was a Yugoslavian between ski jumper who competed between 1948 and 1956.

Career
He finished 41st in the individual large hill at the 1948 Winter Olympics in Sankt Moritz, tied for 16th at the 1952 Winter Olympics in Oslo and was 24th at the 1956 Games. Polda's best career finish was fifth in an individual normal hill event in Austria in 1956.

Invalid ski jumping world record

 Not recognized! Touch ground at world record distance.

References

External links

Olympic ski jumping results: 1948-60
Janez Polda's profile at Sports Reference.com
Biography in Slovene 

Olympic ski jumpers of Yugoslavia
Ski jumpers at the 1948 Winter Olympics
Ski jumpers at the 1952 Winter Olympics
Ski jumpers at the 1956 Winter Olympics
Yugoslav male ski jumpers
Slovenian male ski jumpers
1924 births
1964 deaths
People from the Municipality of Kranjska Gora